The Defence Logistics Directorate is the branch of the Namibian Defence Force responsible for materiel supplies.

History
The directorate was formed in 1990 at the creation of the Defence Force. The inaugural Director for Logistics was Colonel Peter Nambundunga. The directorate is also responsible for preparing the of logistics plans, policies and their implementation. It is also responsible for implementing the transport policy. It controls and archives the  acquisitions of new materiel and equipment. In 1997 the directorate was composed of four divisions, namely:

 Technical Services
 Logistic Acquisitions and Defence Estates
 Operations,Planning & Training
 Supply Commodity management

Units
The unit falling under the Logistics Directorate is the:

 Composite Depot

Leadership

References

Military of Namibia